The 2004 United States presidential election in Delaware took place on November 2, 2004, and was part of the 2004 United States presidential election. Voters chose three representatives, or electors to the Electoral College, who voted for president and vice president.

Delaware was won by Democratic nominee John Kerry by a 7.6% margin of victory. Prior to the election, all 12 news organizations considered this a state Kerry would win, or otherwise considered as a safe blue state. The state was once a bellwether state, but has voted Democratic in every presidential election since 1992. Kerry easily won this state, but with a reduced margin compared to Al Gore's margin four years earlier. As of 2020, this is the last election in which Delaware was decided by a single digit margin, and the only time since 1948 that Delaware has not backed the popular vote winner. Bush became the first Republican since 1880 to win the popular vote without Delaware.

Primaries
 2004 Delaware Democratic presidential primary

Campaign

Predictions

There were 12 news organizations who made state-by-state predictions of the election. Here are their last predictions before election day.

Polling

Just two pre-election polls were taken (specifically in September), and Kerry won both of them with 45% and 50% respectively.

Fundraising
Bush raised $523,150. Kerry raised $260,657.

Advertising and visits
Neither campaign advertised or visited this state during the fall campaign.

Analysis
Delaware, a blue state in presidential elections, had not voted for a Republican presidential nominee for 16 years going into 2004. The last Republican to win Delaware was Bush's father George H. W. Bush in 1988. Since then, the state has consistently delivered to the Democrats at the presidential level.

Results

By county

By congressional district
Due to the state's low population, only one congressional district is allocated. This district, called the At-Large district, because it covers the entire state, and thus is equivalent to the statewide election results.

Electors

Technically the voters of Delaware cast their ballots for electors: representatives to the Electoral College. Delaware is allocated three electors because it has one congressional district and two senators. All candidates who appear on the ballot or qualify to receive write-in votes must submit a list of three electors, who pledge to vote for their candidate and his or her running mate. Whoever wins the majority of votes in the state is awarded all three electoral votes. Their chosen electors then vote for president and vice president. Although electors are pledged to their candidate and running mate, they are not obligated to vote for them. An elector who votes for someone other than his or her candidate is known as a faithless elector.

The electors of each state and the District of Columbia met on December 13, 2004, to cast their votes for president and vice president. The Electoral College itself never meets as one body. Instead the electors from each state and the District of Columbia met in their respective capitols.

The following were the members of the Electoral College from Delaware. All were pledged to and voted for John Kerry and John Edwards:
 James Johnson
 Nancy W. Cook
 Timothy G. Willard

See also
 United States presidential elections in Delaware

References
General

Specific
 
 

Delaware
2004
Presidential